BAITSSS (Backward-Averaged Iterative Two-Source Surface temperature and energy balance Solution) is biophysical Evapotranspiration (ET) computer model that determines water use, primarily in agriculture landscape, using remote sensing-based information. It was developed and refined by Ramesh Dhungel and the water resources group at University of Idaho's Kimberly Research and Extension Center since 2010.  It has been used in different areas in the United States including Southern Idaho, Northern California, northwest Kansas, Texas, and Arizona.

History of development 
BAITSSS originated from the research of Ramesh Dhungel, a graduate student at the University of Idaho, who joined a project called "Producing and integrating time series of gridded evapotranspiration for irrigation management, hydrology and remote sensing applications" under professor Richard G. Allen.

In 2012, the initial version of landscape model was developed using the Python IDLE environment using NARR weather data (~ 32 kilometers). Dhungel submitted his PhD dissertation in 2014 where the model was called BATANS (backward averaged two source accelerated numerical solution). The model was first published in Meteorological Applications journal in 2016 under the name BAITSSS
as a framework to interpolate ET between the satellite overpass when thermal based surface temperature is unavailable. The overall concept of backward averaging was introduced to expedite the convergence process of iteratively solved surface energy balance components which can be time-consuming and can frequently suffer non-convergence, especially in low wind speed.

In 2017, the landscape BAITSSS model was scripted in Python shell, together with GDAL and NumPy libraries using NLDAS weather data (~ 12.5 kilometers). The detailed independent model was evaluated against weighing lysimeter measured ET, infrared temperature  (IRT) and  net radiometer of drought‐tolerant corn and sorghum at Conservation and Production Research Laboratory in Bushland, Texas by group of scientists from USDA-ARS and Kansas State University between 2017 and 2020. Some later development of BAITSSS includes physically based crop productivity components, i.e. biomass and crop yield computation.

Rationale 

The majority of remote sensing based instantaneous ET models use evaporative fraction (EF) or reference ET fraction (ETF), similar to crop coefficients, for computing seasonal values, these models generally lack the soil water balance and Irrigation components in surface energy balance.  Other limiting factors is the dependence on thermal-based radiometric surface temperature, which is not always available at required temporal resolution  and frequently obscured by factors such as cloud cover. BAITSSS was developed to fill these gaps in remote sensing based models liberating the use of thermal-based radiometric surface temperature and to serve as a digital crop water tracker simulating high temporal  (hourly or sub-hourly) and spatial resolution (30 meter) ET maps. BAITSSS utilizes remote sensing based canopy formation information, i.e. estimation of seasonal variation of vegetation indices  and senescence.

Approach and model structure 
Surface energy balance is one of the commonly utilized approaches to quantify ET (latent heat flux in terms of flux), where weather variables and vegetation Indices are the drivers of this process.

Underlying fundamental equations of surface energy balance

Latent heat flux (LE)

Sensible heat flux (H) and surface temperature calculation

The flux-gradient equations of  sensible heat flux and surface temperature in BAITSSS are shown below.

Canopy resistance (r)

Typical Jarvis type-equation of r adopted in BAITSSS is shown below, R is the minimum value of r, LAI is leaf area index,  f is fraction of canopy cover, weighting functions representing plant response to solar radiation (F), air temperature (F), vapor pressure deficit (F), and soil moisture (F) each varying between 0 and 1.

Equations of soil water balance and irrigation decision 

Standard soil water balance equations for soil surface and the root zone are implemented in BAITSSS for each time step, where irrigation decisions are based on the soil moisture at the root zone.

Data

Input
ET models, in general, need  information about vegetation (physical properties and vegetation indices) and environment condition (weather data) to compute water use.  Primary weather data requirements in BAITSSS are solar irradiance (R), wind speed (u), air temperature (T), relative humidity (RH) or specific humidity (q), and precipitation (P). Vegetation indices requirements in BAITSSS are leaf area index (LAI) and fractional canopy cover (f), generally estimated from normalized difference vegetation index (NDVI). Automated BAITSSS  can compute ET throughout United States using  National Oceanic and Atmospheric Administration (NOAA) weather data (i.e. hourly NLDAS: North American Land Data Assimilation system at 1/8 degree; ~ 12.5 kilometers), Vegetation indices those acquired by Landsat, and soil information from SSURGO.

Output

BAITSSS generates large numbers of variables (fluxes, resistances, and moisture) in gridded form in each time-step. The most commonly used outputs are evapotranspiration, evaporation, transpiration, soil moisture, irrigation amount, and surface temperature maps and time series analysis.

Model features

Agriculture system applications and recognition 
BAITSSS was implemented to compute ET in southern Idaho for 2008, and in northern California for 2010. It was used to calculate corn  and sorghum ET in  Bushland, Texas for 2016, and multiple crops in northwest Kansas for 2013–2017. BAITSSS has been widely discussed among the peers around the world, including Bhattarai et al. in 2017 and Jones et al. in 2019. United States Senate Committee on Agriculture, Nutrition and Forestry listed BAITSSS in its climate change report. BAITSSS was also covered by articles in Open Access Government, Landsat science team, Grass & Grain magazine, National Information Management & Support System (NIMSS),  terrestrial ecological models,  key research contribution related to sensible heat flux estimation and irrigation decision in remote sensing based ET models. 

In September 2019, the Northwest Kansas Groundwater Management District 4 (GMD 4) along with BAITSSS received national recognition from American Association for the Advancement of Science (AAAS).  AAAS highlighted 18 communities across the U.S. that are responding to climate change including Sheridan County, Kansas to prolong the life of Ogallala Aquifer by minimizing water use where this aquifer is depleting rapidly due to extensive agricultural practices . AAAS discussed the development and use of intricate ET model BAITSSS and Dhungel's and other scientists efforts supporting effective use of water in Sheridan County, Kansas.

Furthermore, Upper Republican Regional Advisory Committee of Kansas (June 2019) and  GMD 4 discussed possible benefit and utilization of BAITSSS for managing water use, educational purpose, and cost-share. A short story about Ogallala Aquifer Conservation effort from Kansas State University and GMD4 using ET model was published in Mother Earth News (April/May 2020), and Progressive Crop Consultant.

Example application

Groundwater and Irrigation

Dhungel et al., 2020, combined with field crop scientists, systems analysts, and district water managers, applied BAITSSS at the district water management level focusing on seasonal ET and annual groundwater withdrawal rates at Sheridan 6 (SD-6) Local Enhanced Management Plan (LEMA) for five years period (2013-2017) in northwest, Kansas, United States.  BAITSSS simulated irrigation was compared to reported irrigation as well as to infer deficit irrigation within water right management units (WRMU). In Kansas, groundwater pumping records are legal documents and maintained by the Kansas Division of Water Resources. The in-season water supply was compared to BAITSSS simulated ET as well-watered crop water condition.

Evapotranspiration Hysterisis and Advection

A study related to ET uncertainty associated with ET hysteresis (Vapor pressure and net radiation) were conducted using lysimeter, Eddy covariance (EC), and BAITSSS model (point-scale) in an advective environment of Bushland, Texas.  Results indicated that the pattern of hysteresis from BAITSSS closely followed the lysimeter and showed weak hysteresis related to net radiation when compared to EC. However, both lysimeter and BAITSSS showed strong hysteresis related to VPD when compared to EC.

Lettuce Evapotranspiration 
A study related to lettuce evapotranspiration was conducted at Yuma, Arizona using BAITSSS between 2016 and 2020, where model simulated ET closely followed twelve eddy covariance sites

Challenges and limitations 
Simulation of hourly ET at 30 m spatial resolution for seasonal time scale is computationally challenging and data-intensive. The low wind speed complicates the convergence of surface energy balance components as well. The peer group Pan et al. in  2017  and Dhungel et al., 2019  pointed out the possible difficulty of parameterization and validations of these kinds of resistance based models. The simulated irrigation may vary than that actually applied in field.

See also 
 METRIC, another model developed by University of Idaho that uses Landsat satellite data to compute and map evapotranspiration 
 SEBAL, uses the surface energy balance to estimate aspects of the hydrological cycle. SEBAL maps evapotranspiration, biomass growth, water deficit and soil moisture

References

External links 
 BAITSSS at Sites.google.com

Hydrology models
Irrigation
Computer-aided engineering software
Remote sensing
Water resources management
Numerical climate and weather models